Josef Rosensaft (January 15, 1911 – September 11, 1975) was a Holocaust survivor who led the community of Jewish displaced persons (Sh'erit ha-Pletah) through the establishment of a Central Committee of Liberated Jews that first served the interests of the refugees in Bergen-Belsen DP camp and then DP camps throughout the entire British sector.

Rosensaft was born to an affluent scrap-metal dealer in Będzin in Poland and was in his youth active in the Zionist Labor Movement.  He was deported to Auschwitz in 1943 but escaped the transport by jumping into the Vistula River.  He was injured by gunfire during the escape but walked back to Będzin, where he was captured again, given 250 lashes and confined to a chicken cage, before being sent to Auschwitz and several other concentration camps until he was sent on a death march to Bergen-Belsen, where he was liberated on April 15, 1945. He weighed 76 lbs when he was liberated.

He was elected by the refugees in the DP camp to the Central Committee of Liberated Jews and served as the chairman of the British sector committee until it was disbanded in 1950.  In addition to promoting the rights and interests of the refugees, he was an active opponent of the British policy of restrictive Jewish immigration to the British Mandate of Palestine. He met and married a fellow survivor, doctor Hadassah (Ada) Bimko, in the camp. Their son is noted activist Menachem Z. Rosensaft.

After his time in the DP camp, Rosensaft went into the art collection and real estate business and lived in  Montreux, Switzerland before moving to the United States in the late 1950s. He founded and served as president of the World Federation of Bergen-Belsen Survivors, and led a delegation of 200 Belsen survivors to the former camp in 1970 to commemorate the 25th anniversary of its liberation. He was known as an uncompromising advocate for Holocaust remembrance, often saying that he would "never forget, and never forgive."

He died in London while on a business trip there but was buried in New York City. He left a formidable art collection that had to be sold to settle debts related to the acquisition of the art and by some accounts an extravagant lifestyle. The 1976 sale arranged by Sotheby's was bought in its entirety by the Tehran Museum of Contemporary Art, where it all remains today. This sale set a record for a piece by Paul Gauguin called Still Life with Japanese Woodcut at $1.4 million, and the work is currently valued at $45 million.

References

 Irving Spiegel: "Josef Rosensaft, Fled Nazi Camps", obituary in the New York Times, September 13, 1975
 Irving Spiegel: "Survivors Plan Death Camp Visit", in the New York Times, February 22, 1970
 Ralph Blumenthal: "Belsen Inmate Wants Ordeal Kept Vivid", in the New York Times, May 30, 1974
 Grace Glueck: "Nazi Survivor's Art Sale to Yield Millions", in the New York Times, March 17, 1976

Bergen-Belsen concentration camp survivors
American art collectors
1911 births
1975 deaths
20th-century Polish Jews
Polish emigrants to the United States
Auschwitz concentration camp survivors
People from Montreux